Anna Blässe (born 27 February 1987) is a German football striker currently playing for Grasshoppers.

Career
She previously played for VfL Wolfsburg, USV Jena and Hamburger SV.

As a junior international she won the 2004 U-19 World Championship and the 2006 U-19 European Championship.

Personal
She is openly lesbian and
married with her former teammate Lara Dickenmann

Honours

Domestic
Bundesliga: Winner 2012-13, 2013-14, 2016-17, 2017-18, 2018-19, 2019-20
DFB-Pokal: Winner 2012-13, 2014-15, 2015-16, 2016-17, 2017-18, 2018-19, 2019-20

International
UEFA Women's Champions League: Winner 2012-2013, 2013-2014
UEFA Women's Championship: Winner 2013
FIFA U-20 Women's World Cup: Winner 2004
UEFA Women's Under-19 Championship: Winner 2006

Individual
FIFA U-20 Women's World Cup Bronze Shoe: 2006
Fritz Walter Medal: Gold 2006

References

1987 births
Living people
Sportspeople from Weimar
People from Bezirk Erfurt
German women's footballers
German expatriate women's footballers
Footballers from Thuringia
Women's association football defenders
Germany women's international footballers
FF USV Jena players
Hamburger SV (women) players
VfL Wolfsburg (women) players
Frauen-Bundesliga players
20th-century German women
UEFA Women's Euro 2017 players